Walter John Farthing (4 July 1887 – 29 November 1954) was a British Labour Party politician.

Born in Bridgwater, Farthing became involved in the trade union movement, and founded a trades council in the town.  He was elected as the trades council's president in 1917, and served on Bridgwater Borough Council for the Labour Party from 1929.  He was also elected to the executive of the Transport and General Workers' Union.  In 1939/40, he served as Mayor of Bridgwater.

He was elected at the 1945 general election as Member of Parliament (MP) for Frome, and held the seat until the constituency disappeared, and he retired, at the 1950 general election.

References

External links 
 

1887 births
1954 deaths
Councillors in Somerset
English trade unionists
Labour Party (UK) MPs for English constituencies
People from Bridgwater
Transport and General Workers' Union-sponsored MPs
UK MPs 1945–1950